Nicolas Diguiny (born 31 May 1988) is a French professional footballer who plays as a forward or a winger for Cypriot club Apollon Limassol.

Club career

France
Born in Saint-Germain-en-Laye, Diguiny arrived at Vannes OC in 2005, and played for the club for 8 consecutive seasons, from the youth team through the first team. In January 2013, his name was mentioned by stopping a penalty from Metz striker Yeni Ngbakoto in the second half, helping his club to escape with a 1–1 away draw. Two weeks later, he scored four times in a 5–0 win against US Quevilly in the CFA. He also scored for Vannes in the league in a 1–0 win against Poiré-sur-Vie.

Greece

Panthrakikos
In the summer of 2014, Diguiny signed for Panthrakikos of the Greek Super League. He played with former French players like El Fardou Ben Nabouhane, a former Vannes player and top scorer in the Greek Super League, and ex-Monaco and Argentine international Javier Saviola.

Atromitos
On 9 June 2016, Atromitos announced Diguiny's signing for the next two years. On 30 April 2017, in the last matchday of the 2016–17 season, he scored a brace in a 4–1 home win against Platanias.

On 22 April 2018, in his 100th appearance in Greece, Diguiny scored three goals in a 4–1 home win game against Platanias, which secured Atromitos the fourth place in the league. He finished the 2017–18 season with 10 goals and 7 assists in the domestic competitions.

Aris
On 26 June 2018, Diguiny, having been released by Atromitos, signed a two-season contract with newly promoted Aris. On his debut, a 3–0 away win against Lamia, he scored with a header, receiving the MVP award as well. On 2 September 2018, he sealed a 2–0 home win against AEL. On 15 December 2018, he scored in a 2–1 home loss against Panetolikos. On 20 December 2018, he scored a brace in a 3–2 away loss against Ergotelis, which eliminated his team from the Greek Cup round of 16.

On 11 February 2019, Diguiny scored in a 3–0 away win against Asteras Tripolis. On 18 March 2019, he scored a brace against Apollon Smyrnis, helping to a 5–0 home win. On 5 May 2019, in the last matchday of the season, he scored a brace, helping to a remarkable 7–2 home win against Xanthi.

On 1 August 2019, Diguiny's penalty gave Aris a 1–0 away win and a qualification to the Europa League third qualifying round over AEL Limassol. Two weeks later, his goal sent the home game against Molde to extra time, where his team was eventually eliminated from the play-off round.

On 15 September 2019, he scored with a simple tap-in in an astonishing 4–0 home win against Panathinaikos. On 6 October 2019, he scored with a beautiful header to open the score in an eventual 2-1 home defeat against Olympiacos. On 10 November 2019, he scored with a kick in a 2-1 home win game against Asteras Tripolis.

On 19 January 2020, he scored in a disappointing 4-2 away loss against Olympiacos. On 1 March 2020, he scored in a 2-1 home loss against Atromitos.

On 24 June 2020, he scored in a 2-2 home draw for the Greek Cup semi finals, which resulted in his team being eliminated.

Apollon Limassol
On 3 July 2020, he signed a two years' contract with Cypriot First Division club Apollon Limassol for an undisclosed fee.

Personal life
Born in France, Diguiny is of Ivorian descent.

Career statistics

Honours
Vannes
 Coupe de la Ligue: runner-up 2008–09

References

External links
 

1988 births
Living people
Sportspeople from Saint-Germain-en-Laye
Association football midfielders
French footballers
French sportspeople of Ivorian descent
French expatriate footballers
Ligue 2 players
Championnat National players
Super League Greece players
Cypriot First Division players
Vannes OC players
Vendée Poiré-sur-Vie Football players
Panthrakikos F.C. players
Atromitos F.C. players
Aris Thessaloniki F.C. players
Apollon Limassol FC players
Expatriate footballers in Greece
Expatriate footballers in Cyprus
Footballers from Yvelines